The Plumas Railway Station is a flag stop located in Plumas, Manitoba, Canada.  The station is served by Via Rail's Winnipeg – Churchill train.

References

Via Rail stations in Manitoba
Railway stations in Manitoba